Produced by the Environmental Systems Research Institute (Esri, formerly ESRI), the Esri International User Conference (Esri UC) is the world's largest event dedicated to geographic information system (GIS) technology. It is held annually in the United States, usually for one week in July at the San Diego Convention Center in San Diego, California.  The Esri UC dates back to 1981. In 2008, conference attendance grew to more than 14,000 attendees.

The conference offers more than 600 GIS user presentation sessions, 300 exhibitors, 275 technical workshops, 100 special interest, regional, and user group meetings, and 600 map posters and special displays from more than 100 countries. Thousands of professionals from different industries attend the Esri UC. 

There are more than 40 conference tracks divided into the categories of technology, science and modeling, and industry.  The tracks include the topics of business, defense, education, environment, government, health and human services, natural resources, public safety, transportation, and utilities. 

Esri also conducts preconference seminars, a Plenary Session, a Map Gallery and Virtual Map Gallery, GIS concept and industry sessions, panel sessions, lightning talks, an Esri Showcase, a Conservation Showcase, an Academic GIS Program Fair, a Special Achievement in GIS (SAG) Awards Ceremony, and special displays of GIS by organizations such as the National Geographic Society, the National Academy of Science, and the Smithsonian. The Exhibit Hall runs for three days during the event – Tuesday through Thursday – and provides access to Esri business partners and alliances, hardware and software vendors, and solution and data providers.  It also conducts additional sports activities to participate in including a 5K, Golf Tournament, and Tennis Tournament.  

In 2009, four conferences took place concurrently with the Esri UC (the Esri Business GIS Summit, Esri Education User Conference, Esri Homeland Security GIS Summit, and Esri Survey & Engineering GIS Summit.) The Esri Defense and Intelligence Executive Track, Esri Senior Executive Seminar, Remote Sensing and GIS gathering, and Climate Change GIS Special Program also took place during the event. 

A certain amount of complimentary conference registrations are often available with an organization's ArcGIS software maintenance plan.

History 

The first Esri UC took place in 1981 in Redlands, California, at Esri Headquarters, with 15 users, and has been held annually ever since including being held in Palm Springs, California, from 1987 through 1996. The conference was the brainchild of Esri President and Founder Jack Dangermond.

Keynote Speakers

Prior to 1986, no keynote speakers were featured.

1986 – Dr. Duane Marble, Professor of Geography and Computer Science, State University of New York, Buffalo
1987 – Dr. Roger Tomlinson, the primary originator of modern, computerized GIS (known as "the father of GIS" )
1988 – Dr. Robert Aangeebrug, executive director, American Association of Geographers
1989 – Dr. Peter Thacher, assistant secretary general, United Nations
1990 – David Andere from the Kenya Rangeland Ecological Monitoring Unit; David Rhind, geographer and professor, Birkbeck College, University of London; Dr. Kent Smith, Esri consultant; Otto Simonette, director, United Nations Environment Program; and Nancy Tosta, staff director, Federal Geographic Data Committee, and special assistant to the Secretary of the Interior
1991 – Ralph Nader, attorney, author, lecturer, consumer advocate, political activist, and former independent and Green Party candidate for president of the United States
1992 – Dr. Paul R. Ehrlich, author of the book The Population Bomb
1993 – Dr. James Burke, author of the book The Day the Universe Changed and the PBS television series ‘Connections’
1994 – Dr. Edward O. Wilson, the Pellegrino University Research Professor in Entomology for the Department of Organismic and Evolutionary Biology at Harvard University
1995 – John Kenneth Galbraith, economist, Harvard University
1996 – Bruce Babbitt, Secretary of the Interior
1997 – Dr. Ian McHarg, professor emeritus of landscape architecture and regional planning, Harvard University, author of the book Design with Nature
1998 – Dr. Carl Steinitz, professor of landscape architecture and planning, graduate school of design, Harvard University Graphics Lab; Dr. Hasso Plattner, cofounder of SAP AG, a multinational enterprise software development and consulting corporation
1999 – Dr. Sylvia Earle, oceanographer and former chief scientist for the United States National Oceanic and Atmospheric Administration (NOAA)
2000 – Dr. Charles Groat,  director of United States Geological Survey (USGS)
2001 – Michael Fay, ecologist, conservationist, and National Geographic Society Explorer
2002 – Cynthia Moss, conservationist and wildlife researcher and writer who started the Amboseli Elephant Project at Amboseli National Park in Kenya
2003 – Peter Hillary, adventurer and Mt. Everest climber, son of Sir Edmund Hillary
2004 – Dr. Rita Colwell, president, National Science Foundation (NSF)
2005 – Dr. Jane Goodall, anthropologist and chimpanzee researcher
2006 – Bob Kerrey, former Democratic governor and senator of Nebraska and president of The New School university in New York City
2007 – Wangari Maathai, Nobel Laureate and founder of "The Green Belt Movement"
2008 – Dr. Peter H. Raven, director, Missouri Botanical Garden
2009 – Hernando de Soto Polar, economist, author, and president of the Institute for Liberty and Democracy; Willie Smits, biologist, chairman of the Masarang Foundation, and founder of the Borneo Orangutan Survival
2010 – Richard Saul Wurman, architect, graphic designer, and expert in how to make complex information understandable.
2011 – Jacqueline McGlade, Executive Director European Environment Agency.
2012 – Julia Marton-Lefèvre, Director General of the International Union for Conservation of Nature.
2013 – Sam Pitroda, Business Executive, Indian Technology Policy Advisor.
2014 – Penny Pritzker, United States Secretary of Commerce and Dr. Kathleen Sullivan, Under Secretary of Commerce for the National Oceanic and Atmospheric Administration.
2015 – Martin O'Malley, Governor of Maryland.
2016 – Andrea Wulf, historian, author
2017 – Geoffrey West, theoretical physicist, author
2018 – Juan Enriquez, Managing Director of Excel Venture Management
2019 – Jane Goodall, primalogist and anthropologist and E.O. Wilson, biologist and author

Culture 

An orientation session is offered for new attendees at the start of the conference to help them prepare for the week and plan their schedule. The Esri UC comprehensively covers GIS from the perspective of Esri's software and approach; the technical workshops focus on Esri products, and occasionally on software by other vendors as it relates to Esri's products.  GIS software by other vendors – Autodesk, MapInfo, Google, and others – is not the focus of the conference, although translation and interoperability issues may be addressed during technical workshops.

A number of awards are presented during the Plenary Session and throughout the conference week to honor organizations and individuals doing innovative and meaningful things with GIS. Recent plenary award presentations have included the Enterprise Application Award, Making a Difference Award, GIS Humanitarian Award, The President's Award, and Lifetime Achievement Award. Other conference aspects that highlight awards include the Special Achievement in GIS (SAG) Awards ceremony, Map Gallery and Virtual Map Gallery, User Software Applications Fair, sports activities, and other various contests such as scavenger hunts, satellite image picture puzzles (the Where in the World contest), and the closing session question poll.  

The conference's Student Assistantship Program has been started in the early 1990s. Each year, up to 60 accepted students from around the world spend the week monitoring sessions and assisting with other event logistics. The assistantship is unpaid but provides conference registration, hotel accommodations, a stipend for meals, and free time to attend sessions and network. 

For two hours Wednesday night of conference week, the Exhibit Pavilion is open to the family and friends of attendees for Family Night. This is the only time that guests of attendees can visit the Exhibit Pavilion, where technology vendors and demonstrations are available—and attendees can show their guests what GIS involves.   

The GIS Kids Camp provides children of all ages with a way to explore GIS. Children learn how GIS helps them ask questions and visualize the answers. The camp was launched at the 1997 Esri UC in San Diego. Over the years, the program has introduced GIS to more than 1,500 children. 

A conference highlight is the Thursday Night Party, which has a different theme each year that ranges from Mardi Gras to a Renaissance Faire, to Oktoberfest. 

The Spatial Outlet and Bookstore offers T-shirts, mouse pads, and other event memorabilia. There are also GIS books for sale as well as author signings.  This is the spot to acquire souvenirs and books from Esri Press, as well as other specialty merchandise. 

Over the last several years Esri, its business partners, and the San Diego venues have increased the ecofriendliness of the event. Examples of this include using reusable materials and recycled paper for promotional items such as tote bags and agendas; making previously printed items only available on the Web; selling organic T-shirts in the Spatial Outlet store; offering recycling bins, water in bottles which use less plastic, biodegradable food service items, and food purchased from local growers when possible; as well as encouraging and promoting resources for carpooling and renting a bike as transportation for the week.  

Esri turned 40 in 2009. Jack Dangermond (current president) and Laura Dangermond (current vice president) founded Esri in 1969 as a landscape architectural consulting firm. Esri products are used by nearly 80 percent of all GIS users. The company remains a private corporation with consistent annual growth and annual revenue of more than $610 million. There are more than 4,000 employees. The Esri headquarters are located in Redlands, California. There are 10 regional offices in the U.S. and a network of 80 international distributors with about a million users in 200 countries.

References 

Event Planner: Adonn Gallarita

External links
Esri International User Conference site
Esri Homeland Security GIS Summit site
Esri Business GIS Summit site
Esri Education User Conference site
Esri Survey and Engineering GIS Summit site

Geographic information systems organizations
Geographic data and information organizations in the United States
event organizer : Junrey Rivera